Symbrenthia hypatia  is an Indomalayan nyphaline butterfly found in Thailand, Peninsular Malaya, Java, Sumatra, Borneo and the Philippines.

Subspecies
Symbrenthia hypatia hypatia
Symbrenthia hypatia chersonesia Fruhstorfer, 1894 (Malacca)
Symbrenthia hypatia hippocrene Staudinger, [1897] (Borneo)

References

Nymphalini
Butterflies described in 1869
Taxa named by Alfred Russel Wallace
Butterflies of Asia